Bora may refer to:

Geography
 Bora (Australian), the site of an initiation ceremony in Australian aboriginal culture, sometimes known as Bora rings
 Bora, Punjab, a village in India
 Borá, a city in the São Paulo state in Brazil
 Bora (wind), a north to north-eastern katabatic wind in areas near the Adriatic Sea.

Art, entertainment, and media

Fictional entities
 Bora (comics), a Marvel Comics character with wind-related powers
 Bora Horza Gobuchul, the protagonist of the novel Consider Phlebas by Iain M. Banks

Television
 Bora (television series)
 Bora, a super-powerful robot that fought Pluto in an Astro Boy (1980 TV series) episode; Bora's attack is a powerful cry that releases a katabatic wind
 Bora, a character in Dragon Ball
 Bora, a group of rebel colonists found in the 2000 game Tachyon: The Fringe

People

Culture
 Bora language, a Witotoan language spoken in Western Amazon forest region (Peru, Brazil, and Colombia)
 Bora people, the ethnic group that speaks the Bora language

Name
 Bora (surname); also a former military/professional title in Assam
 Bora (Korean name), a Korean feminine given name (including a list of people with the name)
 Bora (Albanian name), an Albanian feminine given name
 Bora (Turkish name), a Turkish masculine given (including a list of people with the name)

Transportation and vehicles
 Bora Class guided missile hovercraft, a hoverborne cruise missile attack craft in the Russian navy
 Bora One and Bora Two, aerodynamic bicycle wheels manufactured by Italian company Campagnolo
 Paradelta Bora, an Italian paraglider design
 Maserati Bora, an Italian sports car named after the Bora wind
 Volkswagen Bora/Jetta, a German small sedan, named after the Bora wind

Other uses
 Bora (wind), a katabatic wind in the Adriatic Sea and the Black Sea regions of southeastern Europe and Turkey
 Bora (missile), a tactical ballistic missile of Turkey
 Bora, an Aurora A  kinase activator in the cell cycle
BORA, acronym for the New Zealand Bill of Rights Act 1990
 Bora, the Guyanese name for Vigna unguiculata subsp. sesquipedalis, a legume that grows in tropical and subtropical climates
 Bora–Hansgrohe, a cycling team sponsored by a German manufacturer of cooktops.

See also
 Yoon Bo-ra, a South Korean idol singer
 Bohra (disambiguation)
 Bora Bora (disambiguation)
Borat, a fictional character

Language and nationality disambiguation pages